The SCAT (Società Ceirano Automobili Torino) was an Italian automobile manufacturer from Turin, founded in 1906 by Giovanni Battista Ceirano.

The company was active from 1906 to 1932 and achieved Targa Florio wins in 1911, 1912 and 1914. The first produced models were the 12 HP, the 16 HP and the 22 HP of 1909.

Ceirano family background

The Ceirano brothers, Giovanni Battista, Giovanni, Ernesto and Matteo, were influential in the founding of the Italian auto industry, being variously responsible for: Ceirano; Welleyes (the technical basis of FIAT); Fratelli Ceirano; Società Torinese Automobili Rapid (STAR/Rapid); SCAT (Società Ceirano Automobili Torino); Itala and SPA (Società Piemontese Automobili). Giovanni's son Giovanni "Ernesto" was also influential, co-founding Ceirano Fabbrica Automobili (aka Giovanni Ceirano Fabbrica Automobili) and Fabrica Anonima Torinese Automobili (FATA).

In 1888, after eight years apprenticeship at his father's watch-making business, Giovanni Battista started building Welleyes bicycles, so named because English names had more sales appeal. In October 1898 Giovanni Battista and Matteo co-founded Ceirano GB & C and started producing the Welleyes motor car in 1899. In July 1899 the plant and patents were sold to Giovanni Agnelli and produced as the first FIATs - the Fiat 4 HP. Giovanni Battista was employed by Fiat as the agent for Italy, but within a year he left to found Fratelli Ceirano & C. which in 1903 became STAR building cars badged as 'Rapid'. In 1904 Matteo Ceirano left Ceirano GB & C to create his own brand - Itala. In 1906 Matteo left Itala to found SPA with chief designer, Alberto Ballacco. In 1906 Giovanni founded SCAT in Turin. In 1919 Giovanni and Giovanni "Ernesto" co-founded Ceirano Fabbrica Automobili (aka Giovanni Ceirano Fabbrica Automobili) and in 1922 they took control of FATA).

Production
SCAT production before World War I:
 1906 12/16 hp 2,724 cc > 1910 15/20 hp 2,951 cc
 1907 16/20 hp 3,190 cc
 1907 22/32 hp 3,770 cc > 1910 22/32 hp 4,398cc > 1912 25/35 hp 4,712 cc
 1912 60/75 hp 6,285 cc
 1914 12/18 hp 2,120 cc
 1915 18/30 hp 3,563 cc

Targa Florio

1911

1912

British driver Cyril Snipe won the 1912 Targa Florio (Giro di Sicilia) on 25 and 26 May, driving a SCAT 25/35 with his co-driver Pedrini. They completed the 965 kilometre course around the island of Sicily in 24 hours 37 minutes 39 seconds, defeating a field of 26 cars which included Lancia, Isotta Fraschini, Fiat and A.L.F.A. The race passed through Palermo, Messina, Catania, Syracuse, Ragusa, Gela, Agrigento, Marsala, Trapani, and back to Palermo.

1913
Snipe drove a SCAT again in the 1913 Targa Florio race, but failed to finish.

1914
In 1914, Ernesto Ceirano drove a SCAT 22/32 to his second victory in the Targa Florio, completing a single 979 km lap of the island in 16 hours 51 minutes 31 seconds at an average speed of 58.07 km/h.

Models
19 models were produced by SCAT:

See also

 List of Italian companies
 List of automobile companies founded by the Ceirano brothers

References

External links 
SCAT automobiles

Ceirano family
Defunct motor vehicle manufacturers of Italy
Vehicle manufacturing companies established in 1906
Italian companies established in 1906
Turin motor companies
Fiat
Brass Era vehicles
1900s cars